The Sling TSi is a South African four-seat, single-engine, low-wing homebuilt aircraft sold in kit form by Sling Aircraft of Johannesburg South. It was developed from the Sling 4.

The Sling TSi first flew in 2018, with kits being shipped to builders in fall 2018.

Design and development
The aircraft was developed in 2018. The Sling TSi is an all-metal, low-wing, fixed tricycle gear homebuilt aircraft. The airplane is equipped with the new Rotax 915iS engine and was the inspiration for the designation of TSi. Parts of the wings and fuselage were reinforced and outfitted with flush riveting for increased strength and reduced drag over the Sling 4.

Operational history
The first Sling TSi in the USA was shown at EAA AirVenture Oshkosh in 2018.

In a review for KitPlanes, writer Paul Dye said, "...it lives up to its design goals. We flew with four full sized adults from a field with a density altitude of 9,000' and had to throttle back to keep from exceeding redline when we leveled off at 10,000. Later, operating off of a dry lakebed in the high desert, with temperatures of 100 degrees, we never had to worry about engine cooling - and it handled like a fine touring machine."

A company demonstrator Sling TSi flew non-stop from Torrance, California, to Tampa Executive Airport on its way to Lakeland, Florida for Sun 'n Fun 2019 in 13.5 hours.

In July 2019 the company did a ceiling expansion test and flew non-stop from Torrance, California to Wittman Regional Airport  to attend EAA AirVenture Oshkosh for 9.75 hours. The aircraft reached a final height of 27,000 feet.

Variants
During EAA AirVenture Oshkosh in 2019 the development of a new high-wing variant, the Sling HW was announced.

Specifications (2020 model Sling TSi)

See also
 Similar aircraft
 Alpi Pioneer 400
 Issoire APM 40 Simba
 Vans RV-10

References

External links
 

2010s South African aircraft
Aircraft first flown in 2018
Low-wing aircraft
Single-engined tractor aircraft
Homebuilt aircraft